Fulvimarina manganoxydans is a Gram-negative and aerobic from the genus of Fulvimarina which has been isolated from a Hydrothermal vent from the Indian Ocean.

References

Hyphomicrobiales
Bacteria described in 2014